Khirbat al-Zababida was a Palestinian Arab village in the Tulkarm Subdistrict. It was depopulated during the 1948 Arab–Israeli War on May 15, 1948. Khirbat al-Zababida was mostly destroyed except for four deserted houses.

History
In 1870, Victor Guérin noted it as an old, rather ruined hamlet, named Kharbet el-Belakieh. It was located on a small hill, and had a path leading to a harbour, where water melons were being shipped out.

In 1882, the PEF's Survey of Western Palestine (SWP) found at Kh. ez Zebabdeh "a small modern ruined village".

British Mandate era
By  1944/45 the village jurisdiction was 10,879 dunams, of which 4,626 was Arab owned, 4,884 was Jewish owned, while 1,369 was publicly owned. Of this, Arabs used 344 dunums of land used for citrus and bananas, 3,839 dunums to cereals, 215 dunums were irrigated or used for orchards,   while a total of 1,750 dunams were classified as uncultivable  areas.

1948, aftermath
The Israeli settlement of  Yakum was established in 1947 on village land,  while Ga'ash was established in 1951, also on village land. 

In 1992 the village site was described: "The site is deserted and overgrown with wild vegetation and trees. All but four of the houses have been destroyed. These four houses still have intact roofs. Three of them were made of cement bricks, and one of hard igneous stone. Iron girders from five destroyed houses protrude from piles of stones.[..] A picnic site has been built for Kibbutz Yaqum on the edge of a natural pond."

References

Bibliography

External links
 Welcome To al-Zababida, Khirbat, Palestine Remembered
  Khirbat al-Zababida, Zochrot
Survey of Western Palestine, Map 10:    IAA, Wikimedia commons

District of Tulkarm
Arab villages depopulated during the 1948 Arab–Israeli War